P. Bhaskaranunni (17 Dec 1926 – 8 April 1994) was a historian and Malayalam literary critic. He received many awards from different agencies of state and central governments.

Life
Born in Kaval Thankasseri Kollam as the son of E. V. Parameswran and K. Karthyayani. Later he permanently resided at Eravipuram Kollam. Educated in St. Antony's school Vaddy, Mayyanad High school, Kollam Sanskrit school and Kollam SN College. He took responsibilities of many positions such as Sub editor in Janayugam Daily, Editorial Board member for Samskarika dairy of Kerala Sahithya  Academy, Nominated member for Kerala state archives, Library council activist and many other social, Political and cultural fields.

He was a teacher in Mayyanad High school.

Writing
Pathompatham Nootandile Keralam – Kerala Sahithya Academy
Keralam-Erupatham Nootandinte Aarambhathil – Kerala Sahithya Academy
Velicham Veesunnu – National Press, Kollam
Smarthavicharam – NBS
Kausthoobham – NBS
Antharjanam muthal Madhavikkutti vare – NBS
Aasante Vicharasaili – NBS
Pattiniyum Avarodhavum – Kerala State Institute of Language
Sahithyathile Neriyum Nerikedum – Prabhath Book House
Vallatholinte Kavitha – Prabhath Book House
Kuttikalude Budhadevan – Mathrubhumi Books
Ayyappante Kavyasilpan – Indian Atheist Publishers
Kollathinte Charithram – Kollam Public Library
Keralam Mukhaprasamgangaliloode – Kerala Press Academi

Awards and honours 
Fellowship from Human resources ministry 
Kerala History Association Award
Kerala Press Academy Scholarship

References

1924 births
1994 deaths
20th-century Indian historians
Indian literary critics
Scientists from Kollam